Cirrhimuraena orientalis is an eel in the family Ophichthidae (worm/snake eels). It was described by Nguyen Khac Huong in 1993. It is a tropical, marine eel which is known from Vietnam, in the western Pacific Ocean.

References

Ophichthidae
Fish described in 1993